Essence Engine is a game engine developed by Relic Entertainment for video game Company of Heroes.

Features
The Essence Engine featured many new graphical effects at the time it was introduced, including high-dynamic-range lighting, dynamic lighting and shadows, advanced shader effects and normal mapping. The Essence Engine is also one of the first RTS engines to create detailed faces with facial animations.

In Company of Heroes: Opposing Fronts, the Essence Engine was further improved to include weather effects, and also added support for DirectX 10 on Windows Vista.

Dawn of War II uses an updated version of Essence Engine (Essence 2.0) which allows for more detailed models and textures; more advanced lighting and shading effects; more complex "sync-kills" than those in Dawn of War; and better support for multi-processor systems.

Company of Heroes 2 is the first game to feature the 3rd generation of the Essence Engine (Essence 3.0) which features DirectX 11 support. Improvement to the engine featured in the game include the new line-of-sight technology, TrueSight, which aims to better emulate troop visibility in real combat. In contrast to traditional unit visibility, TrueSight more accurately represents a unit's visibility range based on environmental conditions and type of unit. Essence 3.0 also incorporates a weather-simulating technology known as ColdTech which allows for realistic obstacles and destructible environments.

Games using the engine

References

2006 software
Relic Entertainment
Video game engines